Peter David de Klerk (16 March 1935 – 11 July 2015) was a racing driver from South Africa. He participated in four Formula One World Championship Grands Prix, debuting on 28 December 1963. He scored no championship points.

Complete Formula One World Championship results
(key) (Races in bold indicate pole position)

Complete Formula One non-championship results
(key) (Races in bold indicate pole position)
(Races in italics indicate fastest lap)

References

External links
Profile at www.grandprix.com
Roy Hesketh Circuit

1935 births
2015 deaths
People from Thaba Chweu Local Municipality
South African racing drivers
South African Formula One drivers
24 Hours of Le Mans drivers
Team Gunston Formula One drivers
World Sportscar Championship drivers
Porsche Motorsports drivers